Edward Gale Latter  (29 February 1928 – 29 August 2016) was a New Zealand politician of the National Party.

Biography

Latter was born in 1928 at Waiau. His parents were Edward Circuit Le Clere Latter and Moana Latter (née Gale).  He received his education from Hapuku Primary, Kaikoura District High School, and Christ's College. He married Anne Morton Ollivier, a daughter of Arthur Ollivier, in 1952.

He represented the Marlborough electorate from 1975. He retired at the next general election in  due to ill-health.

From 1980 to 1985 he was New Zealand's High Commissioner to Canada. Later he returned to New Zealand and was the Director of Civil Defence. During his tenure he coordinated the relief response to Cyclone Bola which hit the North Island in 1988.

He is the author of Marching onward: a history of the 2nd Battalion (Canterbury, Nelson, Marlborough, West Coast) Royal New Zealand Infantry Regiment, 1845-1992. [Christchurch] : The Battalion, 1992.  about the Nelson Battalion of Militia. In the 1964 New Year Honours, he was appointed a Member of the Military Division of the Order of the British Empire.

Latter died on 29 August 2016.

Notes

References

1928 births
2016 deaths
New Zealand National Party MPs
New Zealand non-fiction writers
People educated at Christ's College, Christchurch
High Commissioners of New Zealand to Canada
Members of the New Zealand House of Representatives
New Zealand MPs for South Island electorates
New Zealand Members of the Order of the British Empire